Hello Sunshine is a collection of poems and short stories by Ryan Adams, released on December 1, 2009. The book is published by Akashic Books.

Adams states that: "this is the book of verse where I wake up, where I see myself responding to a world with as much light and as much grace as whatever disappointment I felt. This is where I fell back in love with everything--this is my best work yet." (Preorders of Hello Sunshine were shipped on 18 August 2009 by publisher Akashic Books).

Reviews

Gawker said Adams' prose is like "shiny gold covered shit". Indy Week said "the poems are petulant, myopic and petty".

References

External links
 Hello Sunshine at Akashic Books

Books by Ryan Adams
2009 poetry books